Pat Collins may refer to:
 Pat Collins (baseball) (1896–1960), American baseball catcher
 Pat Collins (American football) (born 1941), American football coach 
 Pat Collins (lighting designer) (1932–2021), American lighting designer
 Pat Collins (showman) (1859–1943), British politician and fairground industry member
 Pat Collins (film critic), American film critic 
 G. Pat Collins (1895–1959), American actor
 Pat Collins (hypnotist) (1935–1997), American hypnotist
 Patricia Hill Collins (born 1948), American sociologist
 Patricia M. Collins, American politician
 Pat Collins (reporter), American TV reporter

See also
 Patrick Collins (disambiguation)
 Collins (surname)